The A 35 road is an A-Grade trunk road in Sri Lanka. It connects Paranthan with Mullaitivu.

The A 35 passes through Velikkandal, Theravikulam and Puthukkudiyiruppu to reach Mullaitivu.

Highways in Sri Lanka
Transport in Kilinochchi District
Transport in Mullaitivu District